Monina Arevalo Zenarosa (born August 22, 1939) is a retired Associate Justice of the Philippine Court of Appeals.

The Court of Appeals is the second highest judicial court in the Philippines, next only to the Philippine Supreme Court.

She is currently the Chairperson of the Independent Commission Against Private Armies, created by President Gloria Macapagal Arroyo, tasked with dismantling private armies in the Philippines. Concurrently, she holds the position of Commissioner of the Presidential Anti-Graft Commission of the Philippines.

Early life and education
Zenarosa was born on August 22, 1939, in Malate, Manila She earned a Bachelor of Laws degree from the University of Santo Tomas Faculty of Civil Law, the oldest law school in the Philippines, in 1959. She passed the Philippine Bar Examinations of the same year at the age of 20. She also attended Far Eastern University Institute of Law where she completed academic requirements for the Master of Laws from 1961 to 1963.

Career
Zenarosa was Presiding Judge of Branch 76 of the Quezon City Regional Trial Court in 1992. The court was designated a Special Criminal Court in 1996. She worked as a trial court judge from 1992 to 2004. President Gloria Macapagal Arroyo appointed her as Associate Justice of the Philippine Court of Appeals on March 15, 2004.

Justice MONINA AREVALO-ZENAROSA brings to the Court of Appeals long experience in the application and interpretation of the law for three decades, first as prosecutor for more than fifteen (15) years and later as Regional Trial Court Judge for fourteen (14) years.

Before her appointment to the Appellate Court on March 9, 2004, Mdme. Justice Zenarosa was Presiding Judge of Branch 76 of the Quezon City Regional Trial Court since April 1992, which had been designated Special Criminal Court on May 3, 1996. She was also acting Presiding Judge of Branch 96 since April 22, 2003. She started in the judiciary as RTC Judge in Angeles City in May 1990, later designated acting Presiding Judge, RTC Branch 80, Quezon City from January 16 – March 31, 1992.

An Asst. Quezon City Prosecutor from 1975 to 1990, she held the positions of Deputized Tanodbayan Prosecutor; Chief, Prosecution Division; Inquest Fiscal for Anti-Narcotics Unit; Chief, Review Division; and Member of the Anti-Subversion Prosecution Panel; Member, Anti-Obscenity Task Force, designated Special Attorney, Office of the Solicitor General; and chairman, Committee on Legal Affairs, Quezon City Consultative Council. Much earlier, she was Projects Officer, Legal Affairs, Task Force on Human Settlements in 1974; technical assistant at the Abaca Development Board from 1966 to 1972 and election registrar in Mercedes, Camarines Norte from 1964 – 66.

She has received numerous citations and awards, among them, the Most Outstanding RTC Judge for the year 2003, given by the Citizens Anti-Crime Assistance Group (CAAG), December 1, 2003 and the Award for Judicial Excellence for RY 1997–1998, by the Rotary International, District 3780. Zenarosa was conferred the 2009 Huwarang Ina award for the law and judiciary category, which is given annually by the National Mother's Day and Father's Day Council and the Ideal Parents and Family Foundation.

She has attended various seminars and conferences here and abroad on a wide range of issues on the application of specific laws and legal concerns. She also observed court proceedings in the US, Europe, and Latin America.

Mdme. Justice Zenarosa graduated from the University of Santo Tomas Faculty of Civil Law in 1959 and passed the Bar Examinations on the same year at the age of 20.

She took up her master's degree course at the Far Eastern University's Institute of Law (completed the academic requirements, 1961 – 63).

She was born on August 22, 1939, in Masbate, Masbate, the 6th among nine siblings, of the late Dr. Salvador B. Arevalo and Conception Altarejos, a pharmacist.

Private life
She is married to Hernando P. Zenarosa (deceased), a retired diplomat and journalist, by whom she has five children: Jose Salvador, an Economics and law graduate based in Tampa, Florida; Dean Hernando, a pediatrician; Anna Karenina, a Mass Communications graduate from St. Paul College and law student, now with her office as Executive Assistant IV; Charisse Del Castillo (deceased), UP BSE – English Major; and Ernest, UP graduate now working at the W Hotel, Atlanta, Georgia. She has four grandchildren, Hans and Sabrina Del Castillo, and Margaret and Hern Thomas Zenarosa.

References 

20th-century Filipino judges
21st-century Filipino judges
University of Santo Tomas alumni
1939 births
Living people
Filipino women judges
People from Masbate
Justices of the Court of Appeals of the Philippines
Far Eastern University alumni
20th-century women judges
21st-century women judges